The Luxembourg identity card is issued to Luxembourg citizens. It serves as proof of identity and nationality and can also be used for travel within the European Union and a number of other European countries.

Eligibility
All Luxembourg citizens who are habitually resident in Luxembourg and aged 15 or over are required to apply for a Luxembourg identity card, whilst it is optional for those under 15. Luxembourg identity cards issued to those aged 15 or over are valid for 10 years.

Application
To obtain a Luxembourg identity card, the applicant has to visit the local administrative office.

See also
Luxembourgish passport
National identity cards in the European Union

References

Luxembourg